Niall O'Toole (born 26 March 1970 in Dublin) is an Irish rower with Commercial Rowing Club.
He competed in three Olympics:
 Barcelona 1992 - Men's Single Scull - 21st
 Atlanta 1996 - Men's Double Sculls - 3rd in Repechage
 Athens 2004 - Men's Lightweight Four - 6th
He won the Men's World Lightweight Single Sculls Championship in 1991 in Vienna and took a silver medal in the same event on Indianapolis in 1994.

References
 
 

1970 births
Living people
Irish male rowers
Sportspeople from Dublin (city)
Rowers at the 1992 Summer Olympics
Rowers at the 1996 Summer Olympics
Rowers at the 2004 Summer Olympics
Olympic rowers of Ireland
World Rowing Championships medalists for Ireland
20th-century Irish people
21st-century Irish people